Jocelyne Taillon (19 May 1941 in Doudeville – 10 June 2004 in Rouen) was a French lyrical singer.

External links 
Musique Opus 31 Biography
 Jocelyne Taillon on Web Cantatas Website
 Jocelyne Taillon on Discogs
 Jacques Offenbach – LES CONTES D'HOFFMANN – Antonia Trio (Van Dam, Plowright, Taillon) on YouTube

French operatic mezzo-sopranos
1941 births
2004 deaths
People from Seine-Maritime
Officers of the Ordre national du Mérite
20th-century French women opera singers